Mazza is a surname of Italian origin. Notable people with the surname include:

 Aldo Mazza, Italian drummer
 Benedetta Mazza (born 1989), Italian beauty queen, actress, television presenter and model
 Bruno Mazza, Italian footballer
 Chris Mazza, American baseball pitcher
 Cole Mazza (born 1995), American football player
 Cris Mazza, American novelist
 Damiano Mazza (artist), 16th century Italian painter 
 Gianni Mazza (born 1944), Italian composer and conductor
 Giorgio Mazza, Italian hurdler
 Giuseppe Mazza (1817–1884), Italian painter 
 Giuseppe Maria Mazza (1653–1741), Italian sculptor 
 Marco Mazza, Italian long-distance runner
 Mario Mazza, Italian educator
 Paolo Mazza, Italian football manager
 Pier Filippo Mazza, Sammarinese footballer
 Raúl Mazza, Argentine painter 
 Robert Mazza, Judge of the Court of Appeal of the Supreme Court of Western Australia
 Salvador Mazza, Argentine physician and epidemiologist
 Tommaso del Mazza, 14th-century Florentine painter
 Valeria Mazza, Argentine fashion model
 Ventura Mazza (c. 1560 - 1638), Italian painter
 Viviana Mazza, Italian writer/journalist

See also 

 Mazza (disambiguation)
 Mazzo (surname)
 Mazzi

Italian-language surnames